"Real People" is a song from  American band Chic's fourth album Real People. It was the second single from this album and like its predecessor, featured a solo lead vocal by Luci Martin.

Background
Exploring new directions in the post-Disco era, Chic continued incorporating harder rock elements into their sound as evident by Nile Rodgers' blaring guitar solos which kick-off and end the song. Audiences were caught off guard by the new Chic sound. Prompting some radio programmers to flip the single and play the more upbeat/dancable B-side "Chip Off The Old Block" instead of the A-side. This, combined with other factors, resulted in the single not making much impact on the charts.

Reception
Record World said it has "impeccable" taste, "stylish production," "topical lyrics," "a sweltering guitar solo" and "vocal perfection."

Chart performance
"Real People" only peaked at number 51 on Billboard's "Hot Soul/Black Singles" chart and number 79 on Billboard's "Hot 100" chart. It failed to chart in the UK, as the song "26" was released as a single, in lieu of "Real People".

Track listings
Atlantic 3768, September 29, 1980
 A. "Real People" (7" Edit) - 3:45
 B. "Chip Off The Old Block" - 4:56

Atlantic promo 12" DMD 247, 1980
 A. "Real People" - 5:20
 B. "Real People" (7" Edit) - 3:45

References

1980 singles
Chic (band) songs
Song recordings produced by Nile Rodgers
Songs written by Nile Rodgers
Songs written by Bernard Edwards
Song recordings produced by Bernard Edwards
1980 songs
Atlantic Records singles